The Cincinnati metropolitan area (also known as the Cincinnati Tri-State area, or Greater Cincinnati) is a metropolitan area centered on Cincinnati and including surrounding counties in the U.S. states of Ohio, Kentucky, and Indiana. The area is commonly known as Greater Cincinnati.

The United States Census Bureau's formal name for the area is the Cincinnati, OH–KY–IN Metropolitan Statistical Area. As of the 2010 U.S. Census, this MSA had a population of 2,114,580, making Greater Cincinnati the 29th most populous metropolitan area in the United States, the largest metro area primarily in Ohio, followed by Columbus (2nd) and Cleveland (3rd). The Census also lists the Cincinnati–Wilmington–Maysville, OH–KY–IN Combined Statistical Area, which adds Clinton County, Ohio (defined as the Wilmington, OH micropolitan area) and Mason County, Kentucky (defined as the Maysville, KY micropolitan area) for a 2014 estimated population of 2,208,450. The Cincinnati metropolitan area is considered part of the Great Lakes Megalopolis.

Census designation history
The Cincinnati, OH–KY–IN, MSA was originally formed by the United States Census Bureau in 1950 and consisted of the Kentucky counties of Campbell and Kenton and the Ohio county of Hamilton. As surrounding counties saw an increase in their population densities and the number of their residents employed within Hamilton County, they met Census criteria to be added to the MSA. The Hamilton–Middletown, OH MSA was also formed in 1950 and consisted solely of Butler County, Ohio.

In 1990, the Census changed designation of the areas known as MSAs to Primary Metropolitan Statistical Area (PMSA), and a new Consolidated Metropolitan Statistical Area (CMSA) grouping was created. From 1990 through 2005, the Cincinnati–Hamilton–Middletown CMSA included the Cincinnati–Hamilton, OH–KY–IN PMSA and the Hamilton–Middletown, OH PMSA.

As of December 2005, Census terminology changed again, eliminating the PMSA/CMSA terminology. Consolidated Statistical Areas (CSA) combine more than one Core Based Statistical Area (CBSA). Newly defined MSAs (Metropolitan) and µSAs (Micropolitan) Statistical Areas are CBSAs. From 2005 to 2013, the Cincinnati–Middletown–Wilmington CSA included the Cincinnati–Middletown MSA (defined as the old Cincinnati–Hamilton–Middletown CMSA), and Wilmington, OH µSA (Clinton County, Ohio).

In 2013, the CSA was redefined again. The Cincinnati–Middletown MSA was renamed the Cincinnati MSA. The Wilmington, OH µSA remained in the CSA. The Maysville, KY µSA, which had previously consisted of Mason and Lewis Counties in Kentucky, was redefined as consisting solely of Mason County and added to the CSA. The name of the CSA accordingly changed to the Cincinnati–Wilmington–Maysville CSA.

In September 2018, Union County, Indiana, was added to the Cincinnati MSA.

Population growth

The metropolitan area's population has grown 8.1 percent between Census 2000 and the 2009 Census population estimate, just under the national population growth rate of 9.2 percent over the same period. This growth rate is about in the middle of the growth rates of other similarly sized mid-western metropolitan areas. For example, the Cleveland metropolitan area lost approximately 2% of population, while Grand Rapids and Louisville both respectively gained 8%, Columbus gained 12%, and Indianapolis gained 14% over the same time period.

The 2009 population estimate from the US Census classifies population changes between natural population increases (number of births minus number of deaths) and net migration (the difference between people moving into the region minus those moving out of the region). Natural population increase contributes fundamentally all of Greater Cincinnati's population growth. A small amount of net international migration to the region is offset by a small amount of net domestic migration out of the region.

The Cincinnati Metropolitan Statistical Area (MSA), which includes seven counties in Northern Kentucky and four in Southeast Indiana, is the largest metropolitan area that includes parts of Ohio, exceeding the population of Greater Cleveland, though both Greater Cleveland and metropolitan Columbus have larger populations within the state of Ohio as of 2013.

Most of the region's population growth has occurred in the northern counties, leading to speculation that the Cincinnati-Northern Kentucky metropolitan area will eventually merge with Greater Dayton. Cincinnati is also located very close to other metropolitan areas, such as Louisville, Lexington, and Frankfort, Kentucky, and Columbus, Ohio.

Statistical information

Notes

1For comparison purposes, population data is summarized using 2008 Census CSA/MSA county definitions.

2Butler County, Ohio was previously known as the Hamilton–Middletown, OH PMSA and was separate from the Cincinnati, OH–KY–IN PMSA until the 1990 Census, when the Cincinnati–Hamilton, OH–KY–IN CMSA designation was used to consolidate the two PMSAs. The CMSA/PMSA designation is no longer used by the US Census.

Counties

Cincinnati, OH–KY–IN MSA
 Brown County, Ohio
 Butler County, Ohio
 Clermont County, Ohio
 Hamilton County, Ohio
 Warren County, Ohio
 Boone County, Kentucky
 Bracken County, Kentucky
 Campbell County, Kentucky
 Gallatin County, Kentucky
 Grant County, Kentucky
 Kenton County, Kentucky
 Pendleton County, Kentucky
 Dearborn County, Indiana
 Franklin County, Indiana
 Ohio County, Indiana
 Union County, Indiana

Maysville, KY µSA
 Mason County, Kentucky

Wilmington, OH µSA
 Clinton County, Ohio

Main cities
In order of 2010 census population:
 Cincinnati, Ohio (298,843)
 Hamilton, Ohio (62,447)
 Middletown, Ohio (48,694)
 Fairfield, Ohio (42,510)
 Covington, Kentucky (40,640)
 Mason, Ohio (30,712)
 Florence, Kentucky (29,951)
 Independence, Kentucky (24,757)
 Oxford, Ohio (21,943)
 Lebanon, Ohio (20,033)
 Norwood, Ohio (19,207)
 Springboro, Ohio (18,931)
 Forest Park, Ohio (18,720)
 Erlanger, Kentucky (18,368)
 Fort Thomas, Kentucky (16,325)
 Newport, Kentucky (15,273)
 Sharonville, Ohio (13,560)
 Blue Ash, Ohio (12,114)
 Wilmington, Ohio (12,520) (CSA Only)
 Loveland, Ohio (12,081)
 Springdale, Ohio (11,223)
 Maysville, Kentucky (9,011) (CSA Only)

Major highways and roads
 Interstate 71
  Interstate 74
  Interstate 75
  Interstate 275
  Interstate 471
   U.S. Route 22 & State Route 3 (Montgomery Road)
  U.S. Route 27 (Colerain Avenue)
  U.S. Route 42 (Reading Road, Lebanon Road)
  U.S. Route 50 (Columbia Parkway, Ohio Pike)
  U.S. Route 52 (Riverside Drive, Kellogg Avenue)
  U.S. Route 127 (Hamilton Avenue)
  Ohio State Route 4 (Springfield Pike, Dixie Highway)
  Ohio State Route 28
  Ohio State Route 32
  Ohio State Route 126 (Ronald Reagan Cross County Highway)
  Ohio State Route 129 (Butler County Veterans Highway)
  Ohio State Route 131
  Ohio State Route 562 (Norwood Lateral)
  Ohio State Route 747 (Princeton Pike)
  Kentucky Route 9 (AA Highway)
  Kentucky Route 17 (Madison Pike)
  Kentucky Route 18 (Burlington Pike)
  Kentucky Route 177 (Decoursey Pike)
 Vine Street, Cincinnati

Universities, colleges, and technical schools

Ohio
 University of Cincinnati
 Xavier University
 Cincinnati State Technical and Community College
 Miami University
 Mount St. Joseph University
 Union Institute & University
 Hebrew Union College
 Art Academy of Cincinnati
 God's Bible School and College

Kentucky
 Northern Kentucky University
 Thomas More University
 Gateway Community and Technical College
 Maysville Community and Technical College

Indiana
 Ivy Tech Community College

Area codes
 513 – Ohio Counties
 937 and 326 – Ohio Counties
 859 – most Kentucky counties
 606 – Bracken and Mason Counties, Kentucky
 812 and 930 – Indiana Counties
 765 – Indiana Counties

Climate
The Cincinnati–Northern Kentucky metropolitan area is located within a climatic transition zone. The southern area of the region, from roughly about the Ohio River, is at the extreme northern limit of the humid subtropical climate; the north part of the region is on the extreme southern cusp of the humid continental climate. Evidence of both humid subtropical climate and humid continental climate can be found here, particularly noticeable by the presence of plants indicative of each climatic region. Within the area, the USDA climate zone rating can vary from as warm as zone 6b to as cool as zone 5b, with the warmest areas tending to be found closest to the Ohio River; individual microclimates of even cooler and warmer temperature may occur in the area but are too small to be considered in the overall climate zone rating. The common wall lizard, introduced from Italy in the 1950s, is an example of fauna in the area that lends a subtropical ambiance to the urban core (near downtown Cincinnati) area of the region.

Significant moderating variables for the overall climate are:
 South and central: Ohio River, Licking River, relatively large hills and valleys, and a combined urban heat island effect due to the close proximity of the Cincinnati-Northern Kentucky cities of Covington, Newport, and Downtown Cincinnati
 Suburban: large parking lots that take up much land in Mason, West Chester, and Florence create a heat island effect.
 North: Great Miami River, the area is situated on a glaciated flat plateau, the Miami Valley, and some urban heat island effect in the immediate area of downtown Dayton and Hamilton.

Traveling through the region from North to South, a subtle but interesting change in climate can be observed and is most evidenced by the gradual increase in the occurrence of subtropical indicator plants in the landscape. Most noticeable are the Southern Magnolia and Mimosa trees, and the needle palm also may be found as a winter hardy landscape specimen in lawns near the Ohio River. During the winter, travellers from north to south will routinely observe a significant difference in snowfall/ice/rain in the region.

Although widely accepted as part of the Midwest, the Cincinnati–Northern Kentucky metropolitan area is climatically and geographically located on the northern periphery of the Upland South region of the United States and is within the Bluegrass region of Ohio and Kentucky.

The area is vulnerable to occasional severe weather—thunderstorms, large hail and sometimes tornadoes.

In media

Cincinnati-based broadcast media outlets often use the terms "Greater Cincinnati" and "Tri-State Area" to refer to their broader viewing or listening areas, especially for the purpose of weather reports or school closings. The viewing areas of WLWT, WCPO-TV, and WKRC-TV all span the same 26 counties, including Adams and Highland counties in Ohio; Fayette, Ripley, Switzerland, and Union counties in Indiana; and Carroll, Owen, and Robertson counties in Kentucky. WXIX-TV additionally includes Decatur County in Indiana and Lewis County in Kentucky.

Dayton-area media outlets similarly refer to a Miami Valley area that includes Butler and Warren counties in Ohio and sometimes Clinton County, Ohio, and Union County, Indiana.

Notes

References

External links
 Ohio Kentucky Indiana Regional Council of Governments
 The Ports of Cincinnati and Northern Kentucky

 
Metropolitan areas of Indiana
Metropolitan areas of Kentucky
Metropolitan areas of Ohio